Verna May Linzey (May 17, 1919 – November 11, 2016) was an American Evangelical theologian and an ordained minister in the General Council of the Assemblies of God and the author of numerous Bibles and books. She is the chief editor of the New Tyndale Version, author of the introductions to the books of the Bible in the Modern English Version Bible (MEV), translator of the Book of Proverbs for the MEV, and she is on the faculty Advisory Board at St. Elias Seminary and Graduate School, located in Hamilton, Virginia. In 2006, The Christian Writer's Guild awarded her the "Best Non-Fiction of the Year" award for authoring The Baptism with the Holy Spirit. In 2011, she received the "Leader of the Year" award at the 2011 Leadership Summit hosted by the Heritage Foundation. She authored the hymn O Blessed Jesus.

She received an MA at Southwestern Assemblies of God University, a Doctor of Ministry degree at Fuller Theological Seminary, and an honorary D.D. at Kingsway Theological Seminary.

Books 

A prolific Bible translator and writer, Linzey authored and edited numerous Bibles and books:

"Proverbs:" Modern English Version (ed. by N. Blake Hearson and James F. Linzey), 2014. Passio.
New Tyndale Version (chief editor), 2013. Military Bible Association.
The Leadership Bible: The Seven Principles of Leadership (editor), 2013. Military Bible Association.
Baptism in the Spirit (co-ed. with James Linzey), 2012. Military Bible Association. 
The Baptism with the Holy Spirit, 2005. Xulon Press. 
Spirit Baptism, 2009. Xulon Press. 
The Gifts of the Spirit, 2014. Creation House. 
Power in the Spirit (co-ed. with James Linzey), 2017. Military Bible Association.

References

1919 births
2016 deaths
20th-century American writers
21st-century American writers
American Pentecostals
Assemblies of God people
Fuller Theological Seminary alumni
Pentecostal theologians
People from Coffeyville, Kansas
Assemblies of God pastors